Poetical testament is a poem genre, somewhat similar to a brief autobiography or last will in verse, in which the poet usually conveys his or her ideologies and beliefs, as well as wishes and hopes.

The oldest poetical testament was "Non omnis moriar" (Latin for "Not all of me will die") of Horace.

Examples:
Le Testament
Testament mój

See also
Chaucer's Retraction

Genres of poetry